Hippohyini was an extinct tribe of Suinae which existed in Asia during the Pliocene.

Genera 
Hippohyini has three genera;

†Hippohyus Falconer & Cautley, 1847 - Pliocene
†Sinohyus von Koenigswald, 1963 - Pliocene
†Sivahyus Pilgrim, 1926 - Pliocene

References

 
Fossil taxa described in 1970
Neogene mammals of Asia
Miocene even-toed ungulates
Pliocene even-toed ungulates
Mammal tribes
Suinae